Boogie Woogie Kids Championship is an Indian dance competition television series created and directed by Javed Jaffrey and Ravi Behl, owners of R&N TV Productions, for  Sony Entertainment Television. Javed Jaffrey, Naved Jafri, and Ravi Behl are the permanent judges on the show.

The series began broadcast of 7 December 2013.

Hosts
Sargun Mehta
Rakshit Wahi

Judges
Javed Jaffrey
Naved Jaffrey
Ravi Behl

Finalists
Abhishek Sinha won the finale. Apart from Abhishek, Aryan Patra, Sachin Sharma, Priyanka Tapaddar and Mohd Mumtaz were the finalists.

Reception
Throughout the globe, Boogie Woogie Kids Championship received mostly positive critical reception.

References

External links
Official website
Boogie Woogie on SET India
Interview with Ravi Behl

2013 Indian television series debuts
Sony Entertainment Television original programming
Indian reality television series
Dance competition television shows
2014 Indian television series endings